Yosyf Zisels, also Josef Zissels, (born 2 December 1946 in Tashkent) is a human rights activist and Ukrainian dissident.

He was a member of the Ukrainian Helsinki group (UHG), involved in the samizdat movement, human rights activist, prominent activist in the Jewish movement in Ukraine, and a political prisoner.

On 24 June 2003, the Council of Leaders of All-Ukrainian Jewish Organizations stated that "Chairman of the Vaad of Ukraine, Joseph Zissels, ‘is declared persona non grata in the Jewish community and has no right to represent the Jewish community of Ukraine’"..

In April 2015, Yosyf Zisels stated that the combination of the swear word "zhyd" and the word "banderite", which killed Jews, "acquired a new meaning and a positive connotation". On 28 April 2015, Yosyf Zissels stated that Ukrainian Jews were joining the neo-Nazi Azov Regiment and that "Ukrainian Jews began to recognize themselves as Jews of Ukraine".

Yosyf Zisels noted that "You cannot hang stereotypical labels on the OUN and UPA, which fought primarily for the independence of Ukraine."

On 13 October 2016, Yosyf Zisels, whitening the OUN-UPA, noted that "representatives of the OUN Ilko Savchin and Mikhailo Svistun hid the Jewish family from the Germans for almost the entire war", but he did not mention that "in 1946, Ukrainian nationalists learned about that the Whistlers helped the Jews during the war, and killed Mikhail and his wife". The director of the Ukrainian Jewish Committee, considers Yosyf Zisels wording as a consequence of an organized disinformation campaign and an attempt to hide the participation of members of the Organization of Ukrainian Nationalists in the extermination of Jews in Babi Yar.

After the speech of the President of Israel Reuven Rivlin on 27 September 2016 in the Verkhovna Rada, during which the President mentioned one and a half million Jews who died in Ukraine, about the Ukrainian Righteous Among the Nations and the complicity of the OUN in the Holocaust, Zissels said that he was already too old, out of his mind a man with "senile dementia" and he does not reflect the opinion of the young. Moreover, Zissels said that he was ready to apologize to the Ukrainians for the words of the Israeli president. Zissels also demanded that the President of Israel apologize. As a result, Zissels himself had to apologize, and wrote a letter to the President of Israel.

On 13 March 2017, Yosyf Zizels, together with Volodymyr Viatrovych, held a conference "Shoah in Ukraine" in Paris.  notes that Zisels, having eaten in a restaurant after the conference, found the cause of the Holocaust and the participation of Ukrainian nationalists in it in the fact that the Jews themselves are to blame, and in particular the Jew Sholom Schwartzbard, who killed the leader Symon Petliura. In the same month (March 2017) about Nadezhda Savchenko, who said "I am not an anti-Semitic, but I do not like Jews!" Zissels said she was "an example of how individual courage defeats the system".

Zisels believes that the monument to Symon Petliura, whose soldiers killed many thousands of Jews, may be in Vinnitsa, where a large number of Jews were exterminated.

On 27 April 2018, Zissels criticized the opinion of 56 US congressmen who were concerned about the "growth of state-funded anti-Semitism", saying that their words were not true.

In May 2018, the Jews of Nikolaev Oblast announced their withdrawal from the Association of Jewish Organizations and Communities of Ukraine. "In the opinion of the members of the Nikolaev regional Jewish community, the position of the VAAD presidium on the glorification of the Ukrainian armed formations that were part of the Wehrmacht and the SS contradicts the position of our organization. And the protest of the VAAD leadership against the congressmen's appeal to the US State Department is an attempt to hide the actual growth of xenophobic sentiments in Ukraine." the statement said.

Opinions about Zisels 
 Israeli historian of the Holocaust , of the Yad Vashem Institute, said in a comment to EADaily: "Zissels is an absolutely courtly, livery Jew who amazes me with speeches and writings that justify Bandera, Shukhevych, and thus other German accomplices".
 The head of the Israeli branch of the Simon Wiesenthal Center, Efraim Zuroff, said that Zisels, "as always, distorts historical reality in order to win the favor of the Ukrainian government".
 The Russian-Israeli politician and publicist Avigdor Eskin noted that Iosif Zisels "has long been known for his extremely extremist views, and back in Soviet times he served twice in camps for distributing Bandera literature." In his opinion, no one gave Zissels the right to speak on behalf of all Jews, since he promotes misanthropic ideas.
 In his statements and actions, Zissels tries to hide the participation of the OUN in the Holocaust and the denial of the Holocaust.

Bibliography
 'Khronika tekushchykh sobytiy' ['Chronicle of Current Events'] (CCE). — New York: Khronika, 1977, issue No. 44 — p. 35. 
 CCE.— New York: Khronika, 1978, issue No. 48.— pp. 43-44. 
 CCE.— New York: Khronika, 1979, issue No. 51.— pp. 41, 151, 178; issue No. 52.— pp. 21-24, 133 
 CCE.— New York: Khronika, 1980, issue No. 53.— p. 29-35, 175; issue No. 57.— p. 88. 
 Vesti iz SSSR [News from the USSR] . V.  1. 1978-1981.— Munich: Prava cheloveka — 1978, 3-16, 4-1;1979, 5-8, 7-2, 8-8, 11-6, 18/19-24, 22-21; 1980, 2-36, 9-11. 
 Vesti iz SSSR. V. 2. 1982-1984. — Munich: Prava cheloveka — 1984, 19/20-2, 23-1. 
 Vesti iz SSSR. V. 3. 1985-1986. — Munich: Prava cheloveka — 1985, 7/8-3. 
 Vesti iz SSSR. V. 4. 1987-1988. — Munich: Prava cheloveka — 1987, 19/20-18; 1988, 5/6-45, 19/20-5. 
 The Ukrainian Helsinki Group. On the 20th anniversary of its creation — Kyiv.: URP, 1996.— p. 13.

References

1941 births
Living people
People from Tashkent
Soviet Jews
Soviet dissidents
Soviet human rights activists
Ukrainian human rights activists
Jewish human rights activists
Ukrainian Helsinki Group
Ukrainian Helsinki Human Rights Union